The Roman Catholic Diocese of Tacna and Moquegua is a suffragan diocese of the Metropolitan Archdiocese of Arequipa in southern Peru, comprising the lay administrative regions Tacna Region and Moquegua region.

History
On 18 December 1944 Pope Pius XII established the Diocese of Tacna from the territory of the Archdiocese of Arequipa. John Paul II renamed it the Diocese of Tacna and Moquegua on 11 July 1992.

Bishops

Ordinaries
Carlos Alberto Arce Masías † (6 Jul 1945 – 17 Dec 1956) Appointed, Bishop of Huánuco
Alfonso Zaplana Bellizza † (17 Dec 1957 – 28 Apr 1973)
Oscar Rolando Cantuarias Pastor † (5 Oct 1973 – 9 Sep 1981) Appointed, Archbishop of Piura
Oscar Julio Alzamora Revoredo, S. M. † (16 Dec 1982 – 13 Feb 1991)
José Hugo Garaycoa Hawkins † (6 Jun 1991 – 1 Sep 2006)
Marco Antonio Cortez Lara (1 Sep 2006 – present)

Coadjutor bishops
José Eduardo Velásquez Tarazona (2000-2004), did not succeed to see; appointed Bishop of Huaraz
Marco Antonio Cortez Lara (2005-2006)

Other priest of this diocese who became a bishop
José Germán Benavides Morriberón † , appointed Bishop of Chachapoyas in 1958

References

Tacna
Tacna
Christian organizations established in 1944
Roman Catholic dioceses and prelatures established in the 20th century